The Nipper is a 1930 British musical film directed by Louis Mercanton and starring Betty Balfour, John Stuart, and Anne Grey. It is also known by the alternative title The Brat.

Cast
 Betty Balfour - The Nipper
 John Stuart - Max Nicholson
 Anne Grey - Clarissa Wentworth
 Alf Goddard - Alf Green
 Gibb McLaughlin - Bill Henshaw
 Percy Parsons - Joubert
 Helen Haye - Lady Sevenoaks
 Louis Goodrich - Woolf

References

External links

1930 films
British musical comedy films
1930 musical comedy films
Films directed by Louis Mercanton
British black-and-white films
Films shot at Imperial Studios, Elstree
1930s English-language films
1930s British films